Franko Luin (6 April 1941 in Trieste, Italy – 15 September 2005 in Tyresö, Sweden) was a Swedish type designer of Slovene origin. He studied graphic arts at Grafiska Institutet in Stockholm, where he graduated in 1967. A graphic designer at the telecom company Ericsson (1967–1989), He started his own design shop Omnibus Typografi in 1989.

Franko Luin had a keen interest in languages, particularly the international auxiliary language Esperanto, and was for many years president of the Swedish Esperanto association SEF. He wrote poems, translated songs into Esperanto and organized a well renowned homepage, the Kiosk, which had an enormous link list of online newspapers. In his later years, he collected and digitized many 19th and 20th century works by Slovene classical authors and distributed them on his homepage Beseda ("Word").

Typefaces of his design

Ad Hoc
Baskerville Classico
Birka
Bodoni Classico
Carniola
Caslon Classico
Cirkus
Devin
Dialog
Edinost
Emona
Esperanto
Fortuna
Garamond Classico
Goudy Modern 94
Goudy Village
Griffo Classico
Humana
Inko
Isolde
Jenson Classico
Jesper
Jonatan
Kalix
Kasper
Kis Classico
Luma
Manuskript
Marco Polo
Maskot
Memento
Miramar
Norma
Nyfors
Odense
Odense Neon
Omnibus
Pax
Pax #2
Persona
Ragnar
Res Publica
Rustika
Saga
Semper
Stockholm Runt
Transport
Valdemar
Vega antikva
Zip 2000

Notes

External links 

1941 births
2005 deaths
Swedish graphic designers
Swedish typographers and type designers
Swedish Esperantists
Translators to Esperanto
Artists from Trieste
Italian Slovenes
Slovenian designers
Slovenian graphic designers
Slovenian typographers and type designers
20th-century translators